Myke Hurley (born 1988) is a British professional podcaster residing in London. He is the co-founder of the podcast network Relay FM.

Career

In 2011 Hurley formed the podcasting network 70Decibels, which was purchased by the 5by5 network in March 2013.

In 2014 he founded the podcast network Relay FM with Stephen M. Hackett. Within one year the network featured 16 different shows and delivered 1.5 million downloads per month.

In 2016, Apple featured Hurley in its podcast series Events at the Apple Store, and Business Insider listed him in the UK Tech 100.

In September 2016, Hurley started a vlogging channel on YouTube.

Podcasts

Current
Some podcasts currently hosted by Hurley are listed below.
 Analog(ue), with co-host Casey Liss
 BONANZA!, with co-host Matt Alexander 
 Connected, with co-hosts Stephen M. Hackett and Federico Viticci
 Cortex, with co-host CGP Grey 
 Myke at the Movies, with co-hosts Casey Liss and Jason Snell. Hosted on The Incomparable.
 Remaster, with co-hosts Shahid Kamal and Federico Viticci 
  The Backmarkers, with co-host Austin Evans
 The Pen Addict, with co-host Brad Dowdy 
 Thoroughly Considered, with co-hosts Tom Gerhardt and Dan Provost
 Ungeniused, with co-host Stephen M. Hackett
 Upgrade, with co-host Jason Snell

Former
Some podcasts formerly hosted by Hurley are listed below.
 Bionic, with co-host Matt Alexander
 CMD+Space
 Inquisitive
 Playing for Fun, with co-host Tiffany Arment
 The Prompt, with co-hosts Stephen M. Hackett and Federico Viticci
 The Ring Post, with co-hosts Dave Tach and Henry T. Casey. Hosted on The Incomparable.
 The Test Drivers, with co-host Austin Evans
 Virtual, with co-host Federico Viticci

References

External links 
 Official site

British podcasters
British company founders
5by5 Studios
Living people
1988 births